Dimitris Poulikakos (born 21 January 1943) is a Greek actor and rock singer. He is the leader of the rock band Exadaktylos and a member of the band MGC.

Filmography 
Dimitris Poulikakos participated in more than 60 movies
1972: Fonissa, I (a.k.a. The Murderess)
1972: Aldevaran
1975: Kelli miden, To
1976: Happy Day
1976: Diadikasia (a.k.a. Proceedings)
1977: Mia zoi se thymamai na fevgeis
1977: Arhontes (T' eihes Gianni, t' eiha panta)
1978: Tembelides tis eforis koiladas, Oi (a.k.a. Idlers of the Fertile Valley)
1981: Souvliste tous! Etsi tha paroume to kouradokastro (a.k.a. Barbecue Them!)
1981: Apenanti, Oi (a.k.a. A Foolish Love)
1982: Arpa Colla
1982: Reporter, O
1982: Aima ton agalmaton, To (a.k.a. The Bleeding Statues)
1983: O Drakoulas ton Exarheion (a.k.a. Dracula of Exarcheia) (also Composer)
1983: Parexigisi, I (a.k.a. Misunderstanding)
1983: Revanche
1984: Loufa kai parallagi (a.k.a. Loaf and Camouflage)
1984: To kanoun kathe mera
1985: Meteoro kai skia (a.k.a. Meteor and Shadow)
1985: Kai pali oraioi eimaste
1986: Periptosi aftodikias
1986: Melissokomos, O (a.k.a. The Beekeeper)
1987: Sweet Country (a.k.a. Glykeia patrida) with Jane Alexander, Randy Quaid)
1987: Made in Greece
1987: Tile-kannivaloi (a.k.a. Telecannibals)
1987: Terirem
1987: Patris, listeia, oikogeneia
1987: Paidia tis Helidonas, Ta (a.k.a. The Children of the Swallow)
1987: Bios + politeia (a.k.a. Living Dangerously)
1987: ... kai dyo avga Tourkias (a.k.a. Two Turkish Eggs)
1988: Fakellos Polk ston aera, O (a.k.a. The Polk File on Air)
1989: Oi Aftheretoi (TV Series)
1989: Gamos sto Perithorio (a.k.a. A Wedding on the Fringe)
1990: Erastes sti mihani tou hronou (a.k.a. Lovers Beyond Time)
1991: Meteoro vima tou pelargou, To (a.k.a. The Suspended Step of the Stork) with Marcello Mastroianni, Jeanne Moreau
1992: Donusa
1994: Gynaika pou epistrefei, I (a.k.a. The Woman Who Comes Back)
1994: Spiti stin exohi, To (a.k.a. Country House)
1995: Un bruit qui rend fou (a.k.a. The Blue Villa) with Fred Ward, Arielle Dombasle
1995: Me ton Orfea ton Avgousto (a.k.a. Orpheus Descending)
1995: Tranzito (a.k.a. Transito)
1995: Sapounopetra – To hrima sto laimo sas (a.k.a. Sapounopetra)
1995: Ftero tis mygas, To (a.k.a. The Wing of the Fly)
1998: Rodina akrogialia, Ta (a.k.a. Shores of Twilight)
1998: Medousa (a.k.a. Medusa)
1999: Thilyki etaireia (a.k.a. Company of Women)
2000: Vitsia gynaikon (a.k.a. Women's Vices)
2000: Milo tis eridos, To (a.k.a. The Apple of Discord)
2000: Epohi ton asevon, I (a.k.a. The Age of Irreverence)
2007: Erotika mathimata gia epanastatiki drasi (a.k.a. Love Lessons on Revolutionary Action)
2008: Athina – Konstadinoupoli (a.k.a. Athens – Istanbul)

Discography
1976: Metafore – ekdrome o Mitsos
1979: Crazy Love stou Zografou
2004: Adespota Skylia

Participations
Rock stories
1984: Revans
1984: Zorba the Freak
1996: Paspartou
1998: Oulf!
2000: 11

References

External links 
 

1942 births
Living people
Male actors from Athens
Singers from Athens
Greek male film actors
20th-century Greek male singers